Back to the Future: The Pinball is a 1990 pinball machine designed by Joe Kaminkow, Ed Cebula and released by Data East, based on the Back to the Future film trilogy.

Background
Released a month after the third movie's release in theaters, the game features four songs from the three films. The Power of Love and Back in Time (by Huey Lewis and the News), Doubleback (by ZZ Top) and Alan Silvestri's orchestral theme. 

Michael J. Fox refused to permit his image to be used to adorn the back glass of the game, so the replacement image of his character Marty McFly wearing sunglasses on the game's backglass and playfield was portrayed by Brad Faris, son of Data East pinball artwork designer Paul Faris. 

Joe Kaminkow, one of the pinball game designers, also appeared as Fox's character on the advertising flyer and Gary Stern, former president of Data East Pinball and current CEO of Stern Pinball, was in Christopher Lloyd's role as Doc Brown in the flyer as well.

Back to the Future Pinball is also significant because it was one of the final mass production Data East made using a numeric display. In 1991 games would have a "Dot Matrix Display" beginning with "Checkpoint" and games like Batman, Star Trek and Ninja Turtles.

See also
 List of Back to the Future video games

References

External links
 
 

1990 pinball machines
Pinball
Data East pinball machines
Pinball machines based on films